Sabrina Cruz is a Canadian YouTuber best known for posting videos on her main channel, Answer in Progress, formerly known as NerdyAndQuirky, which she launched on January 6 2012. As of December 2022, the channel has 1.14 million subscribers and 53.64 million views. She also hosted Crash Course Kids, the children-oriented version of the educational YouTube series Crash Course.

Originally from Toronto, Ontario, she graduated from Notre Dame Catholic Secondary School in Ajax. She posted her first video on YouTube when she was in grade 7; the now-deleted video depicted her eating a cookie. In October 2016, she was a first-year undergraduate at the University of Toronto's Innis College, Toronto, from which she received a Schulich Leader Scholarship in that year. She studied mathematics at the University of Toronto, and hopes to do financial work for a big company. She spoke at one panel at the 2015 VidCon, where she also moderated another panel. In 2017 Cruz was nominated in the Breakout YouTuber category at the 9th Shorty Awards.

In 2020, she, along with Taha Khan and Melissa Fernandes, started Answer In Progress, a digital media project funded by the Super Patron Creator Arts grant.

References

External links 

 
 Interview on Fusion
 So You Want To Be A YouTuber? | Sabrina Cruz | TEDxUofT

Canadian YouTubers
People from Ajax, Ontario
University of Toronto alumni
Canadian people of Filipino descent
Living people
Year of birth missing (living people)